The siege of Tikhvin was a part of the Ingrian War and the Time of Troubles.

Prelude 
After the Battle of Klushino, Swedish troops, who had been summoned to Russia in 1609 by Vasily Shuisky, declared war on Russia and in 1611 occupied Novgorod and Tikhvin.

On June 4, 1613, local Streltsy and noblemen rose up against the Swedish garrison and destroyed it. Upon learning of this, the Swedes undertook a punitive expedition to Tikhvin and burned the town, but could not take the Assumption Monastery.

Siege of the Tikhvin Monastery 
Tikhvin was approached by a detachment of Russian troops, headed by Prince Semyon Prozorovsky. Meanwhile, the Swedes assembled a 5,000-strong army, which included German infantry, Finnish Reiters, 2,000 Lithuanian riders, as well as artillery and engineers.

However, counterattacks by the defenders of the monastery obstructed the siege works, and on September 17 the defenders repulsed the first general assault. In the Swedish camp riots began due to the late payment of salaries. On September 23, the Swedes, who learned of the acute shortage of gunpowder and lead in the fortress, made a second assault. Even women and children participated in the defense. Again the Swedes were beaten off, after which the defenders counterattacked and forced the enemy to retreat, leaving behind their siegeworks and equipment.

Aftermath 
Prince Semyon Prozorovsky later became a benefactor of the monastery and in old age took monastic vows there.

References 

Conflicts in 1613
Tikhvin
Tsardom of Russia
1613 in Russia
Russia–Sweden military relations
History of Leningrad Oblast